This is a list of civil parishes in the ceremonial county of Worcestershire, England. There are 195 civil parishes.

Bromsgrove
Two separate parts of the former Bromsgrove Urban District are unparished.

Malvern Hills
The whole of the district is parished.

Redditch
Part of the former Redditch Urban District is unparished.

Worcester
The former Worcester County Borough is unparished.

Wychavon
The whole of the district is parished.

Wyre Forest
Bewdley (town)1
Broome 9
Chaddesley Corbett 9
Churchill and Blakedown 9
Kidderminster 8
Kidderminster Foreign 9
Ribbesford 9
Rock 9
Rushock 9
Stone 9
Stourport-on-Severn (town)14
Upper Arley 9
Wolverley and Cookley 9

Notes
 Formerly Bewdley Municipal Borough
 Formerly Bromsgrove Rural District
 Formerly Bromsgrove Urban District
 Formerly Droitwich Municipal Borough
 Formerly Droitwich Rural District
 Formerly Evesham Municipal Borough
 Formerly Evesham Rural District
 Formerly Kidderminster Municipal Borough
 Formerly Kidderminster Rural District
 Formerly Malvern Urban District
 Formerly Martley Rural District
 Formerly Pershore Rural District
 Formerly Redditch Urban District
 Formerly Stourport on Severn Urban District
 Formerly Tenbury Rural District
 Formerly Upton upon Severn Rural District
 Formerly Worcester County Borough

References

See also
 List of civil parishes in England

External links
 Office for National Statistics : Geographical Area Listings

 01
Civil parishes
Worcestershire
Civil parishes
Civil parishes